Misael Messias Nunes Xavier (born 10 June 2002), known as Misael Caminhoneiro or just Misael, is a Brazilian footballer who plays as an attacking midfielder for Portuguesa.

Club career
Born in Mairiporã, São Paulo, Misael joined Portuguesa's youth setup in 2017. He made his senior debut for the club on 17 September 2021, coming on as a late substitute for Felipe Souza in a 1–1 away draw against São Caetano, for the year's Copa Paulista.

Back to the under-20 team for the 2022 season, Misael renewed his contract on 14 July of that year. On 17 November 2022, he further extended his link until the end of the 2023 Campeonato Paulista.

Promoted to the first team for the 2023 campaign, Misael played 13 minutes in the season opener, a 2–0 Campeonato Paulista home loss against Botafogo-SP on 14 January.

Career statistics

References

2002 births
Living people
Footballers from São Paulo (state)
Brazilian footballers
Association football midfielders
Associação Portuguesa de Desportos players